Jeon Sung-Ha or Sung-Ha Jeon (born April 6, 1987) is a South Korean football striker who played in PSAP Sigli.

External links

Living people
1987 births
South Korean footballers
South Korean expatriate footballers
Association football forwards
Expatriate footballers in Indonesia
Liga 1 (Indonesia) players
Persiram Raja Ampat players
PSAP Sigli players